The Peterhoff is a building in Chaura Maidan, Shimla which housed at least seven Viceroys and Governors General of India during the British Raj. It was built in Tudor style, with wooden frames and shingled eaves. The building is situated in Annadale in the ward of Shimla.

Its first occupant was James Bruce, 8th Earl of Elgin, who moved into the building in 1863.

After India's independence from the British Empire, the building served as the Punjab High Court. It was at Peterhoff that the trial of Nathuram Godse, who assassinated Mahatma Gandhi, took place in 1948–49. In 1971, when Himachal Pradesh became a full-fledged state, Peterhoff served as the Raj Bhavan (the Governor's residence).

The building was destroyed in a fire on the night of 12 January 1981. Subsequently, the Raj Bhavan was shifted to the Barnes' Court building. The Peterhof was rebuilt to a new design as a luxury hotel in 1991. It has 34 suites. Seventeen rooms of the hotel are owned by Himachal Pradesh Tourism Development Corporation (HPTDC) and the rest are reserved for the governor, chief minister, state guests and general administration department.

References

Official residences in India
Government Houses of the British Empire and Commonwealth
Buildings and structures in Shimla